Hemmatabad (also Romanized as Hemmatābād) is a village in Golshan Rural District, in the Central District of Tabas County, South Khorasan Province, Iran. At the 2006 census, its population was 101, in 30 families.

References 

Populated places in Tabas County